The 2019 Acura Grand Prix of Long Beach was the fourth round of the 2019 IndyCar season and the 45th annual running of the Acura Grand Prix of Long Beach. The 85 lap race was held on April 14, 2019, in Long Beach, California. Alexander Rossi dominated the race from the pole position scoring his sixth career IndyCar victory.

Results

Qualifying

Race 

Notes:
 Points include 1 point for leading at least 1 lap during a race, an additional 2 points for leading the most race laps, and 1 point for Pole Position.

Championship standings after the race

Drivers' Championship standings

Manufacturer standings

 Note: Only the top five positions are included.

References 

Grand Prix of Long Beach
Acura Grand Prix of Long Beach
Acura Grand Prix of Long Beach
Acura Grand Prix of Long Beach